James Dalrymple may refer to:

James Dalrymple, 1st Viscount of Stair (1619–1695)
Sir James Dalrymple, 1st Baronet (1650–1719), second son of the above
James Dalrymple, 3rd Earl of Stair
Jamie Dalrymple (born 1981), English cricketer
Sir James Dalrymple, 2nd Baronet, Principal Auditor of the Exchequer in Scotland
Sir James Dalrymple, 4th Baronet (died 1800), see Dalrymple baronets
James Dalrymple Duncan Dalrymple, Scottish landowner, antiquarian and amateur chemist
Jim Dalrymple, co-founder of MacCentral